The Carlist Wars were a series of civil wars that took place in Spain during the 19th century. The contenders fought over claims to the throne, although some political differences also existed. Several times during the period from 1833 to 1876 the Carlists — followers of Don Carlos (1788–1855), an infante, and of his descendants — rallied to the cry of "God, Country, and King" and fought for the cause of Spanish tradition (Legitimism and Catholicism) against liberalism, and later the republicanism, of the Spanish governments of the day. The Carlist Wars had a strong regional component (Basque region, Catalonia, etc.), given that the new order called into question region–specific law arrangements and customs kept for centuries.

When King Ferdinand VII of Spain died in 1833, his widow, Queen Maria Cristina, became regent on behalf of their two-year-old daughter Queen  Isabella II.  The country splintered into two factions known as the Cristinos (or Isabelinos) and the Carlists.  The Cristinos supported Queen Maria Cristina and her government, and were the party of the Liberals.  The Carlists advocated for Infante Carlos of Spain, Count of Molina, a pretender to the throne and brother of the deceased Ferdinand VII. Carlos denied the validity of the Pragmatic Sanction of 1830 that abolished the semi Salic Law (he was born before 1830). The Carlists wanted a return to autocratic monarchy.

While some historians count three wars, other authors and popular usage refer to the existence of two major engagements, the First and the Second Carlist Wars, treating the 1846–1849 events as a minor episode.

The First Carlist War (1833–1840) lasted more than seven years and the fighting spanned most of the country at one time or another, although the main conflict centered on the Carlist homelands of the Basque Country and Aragon, Catalonia and Valencia.
The Second Carlist War (1846–1849) was a minor Catalan uprising. The rebels tried to install Carlos, Count of Montemolín on the throne. In  Galicia, a smaller-scale uprising was put down by General Ramón María Narváez.
The Third Carlist War (1872–1876) began in the aftermath of the deposition of one ruling monarch and the abdication of another. Queen Isabella II was overthrown by a conspiracy of liberal generals in 1868, and left Spain in some disgrace. The Cortes (Parliament) replaced her with  Amadeo, the Duke of Aosta (and second son of King  Victor Emmanuel of Italy). Then, when the Spanish elections of 1872 resulted in government violence against Carlist candidates and a swing away from Carlism, the Carlist pretender,  Carlos VII, decided that only force of arms could win him the throne. Thus the Third Carlist War began; it lasted for four years, until 1876.
The Spanish Civil War (1936–1939) became for Carlists another crusade against secularism. In spite of the victory of their side, General Francisco Franco frustrated the pretensions of Carlist monarchism; he subsumed their militias into the  Nationalist army and their political party, the Traditionalist Communion, into his "National Movement", the FET y de las JONS.
The Carlists were primarily composed of rural and traditionalist elements, and were more successful initially due to their use of guerrilla warfare tactics. However, they were ultimately defeated by the liberal forces led by General Baldomero Espartero.

See also

References

Further reading
 Carr, Raymond. Spain, 1808-1975 (1982), pp 184–95
 Clarke, Henry Butler. Modern Spain, 1815–98 (1906) old but  full of factual detail online
 Holt, Edgar. The Carlist Wars in Spain (1967).
 Payne,  Stanley G. History of Spain and Portugal: v. 2 (1973) ch 19–21

19th century in Spain
Political history of Spain
Carlism
Wars of succession involving the states and peoples of Europe
Civil wars of the Industrial era
de:Carlismus#Die_Carlistenkriege